Laila El Khalifi (born 6 September 1971) better known by her stage name Leila K, is a Swedish Eurodance singer and rapper of Moroccan descent.

Early life
El Khalifi's parents decided to send her to a school in Morocco, but she did not fit into the system so after one year she returned to Sweden.

Musical career
Leila was discovered by the musical duo Rob'n'Raz when singing in a music contest. They liked her music and offered her a recording contract in 1988. Together with Rob'n'Raz she had her first hit in 1989 with the song "Got to Get" (first recorded within the UK as a pre-production demo by Pete Towns of P&P Productions) and released an album in 1990, Rob'n'Raz featuring Leila K.

During the first years of her career she had many chart-topping hits and her music was played all over Europe. She broke up with Rob'n'Raz and went on her own to Ibiza, where she set up concerts on her own. In 1990 she collaborated with Dr. Alban on his single "Hello Afrika". Her solo career started in 1991 with the single "Time" which she followed up with other singles, such as "Open Sesame" and a cover version of Plastic Bertrand's "Ça Plane Pour Moi".

In 1995 Leila K was back on the music scene with the single "Electric". She kept releasing new music until 1997, but since then she has not released anything new.

In 1998, SVT made a documentary about Leila K's claim for stardom called Fuck You, Fuck You Very Much. The event focuses on an incident that happened during the 1996 Swedish Grammis awards. In 2000, she appeared on Daisy Dee's "Open Sesame" video, a cover of her own 1992 hit. This mentioned song is sampled on U96's single "Love Religion". Daisy Dee was the presenter of the show Viva Club Rotation at the time. In 2003, Swedish media reported that Leila K was living on the streets, stealing food for herself. The record company decided to help her financially by releasing a compilation album titled Leila K's Greatest Tracks.

In 2005, the Swedish cartoonist Martin Kellerman conducted an interview with Leila K for his own comic book magazine, Rocky. In June 2007, Swedish media reported that she turned up as a surprise guest at a release party for the book Bögjävlar, performing the songs "Ça Plane Pour Moi" and "Electric".

In May 2011, Leila K appeared for the first time in years as a feature guest on a new track called "Legendary", by artist Wallenberg.

Discography

Studio albums

Singles

See also
 Music of Sweden

References

External links
  Leila K Tribute Myspace
 Leila K on The Eurodance Encyclopædia
 
 Horreurs Musicales – – Horreurs Musicales 

1971 births
Living people
Swedish people of Moroccan descent
Swedish dance musicians
Swedish women rappers
Swedish women singers
Eurodance musicians
Singers from Gothenburg
English-language singers from Sweden